The 1954 European Baseball Championship was the first European Championship in this sport. It featured 4 of the 5 members of the new Confederation of European Baseball, as France failed to field a team. The Netherlands, which would dominate the event over the next fifty years, was not part of the organization because they did not think it would be sustainable. The Championship was held on June 26 and June 27 in Antwerp, Belgium. A messy affair, there was an average of over 10 errors per game due to the low quality of baseball in Europe at that time. Italy took gold, beating Belgium 6-1 and Spain 7-4. Spain won silver despite 8 errors in its loss to Italy. Spain beat Germany by a score of 10-4 in its other contest. Belgium earned bronze, beating Germany 12-5. Germany placed last.

Standings

References
(NL) European Championship Archive at honkbalsit

European Baseball Championship
European Baseball Championship
1954
1954 in Belgian sport
European Baseball Championship
Sports competitions in Antwerp
20th century in Antwerp